Kikyō may refer to:
Platycodon, species of herbaceous flowering perennial plant native to East Asia
Kikyō Station, JR railway station in Hakodate, Hokkaido, Japan

Works
Kikyō (novel), 1948 Japanese novel by Jirō Osaragi
 (帰郷), 1950 Japanese film for which Shin Saburi won the Mainichi Film Award for Best Actor
"Kikyō", 1992 chapter of manga series Master Keaton
"Kikyō" or "The Return", 2003 chapter of manga series Naruto
"Kikyō", 2005 episode of anime series Shuffle!
"Kikyō" or "Back to the City", 2008 chapter of manga series Boys on the Run
"Kikyō" or "Homecoming", 2008 episode of anime series D.Gray-man
"Kikyō", 2008 episode of Marvel Anime
"Kikyō" or "Homecoming", 2014 chapter of manga series Vinland Saga

Fictional characters
Kikyo, recurring character in manga and anime series Inuyasha
Kikyō Yoshikawa, character in light novel series A Certain Magical Index
Kikyo Zoldyck, character in manga series Hunter × Hunter
Kikyō, real name of Gengan in anime series Koihime Musō

See also
Kikyō-mon, gate in Edo Castle, Tokyo
Article about the 1950 film on Japanese Wikipedia